[[File:Portrait of Louise Élisabeth de Bourbon (1693-1775), Princess of Conti by Pierre Gobert.jpg|thumb|right|250px|Pierre Gobert, Louise Élisabeth de Bourbon, princesse de Conti (1693-1775)]]

Pierre Gobert (1662 – 13 February 1744) was a French painter.

He was born in Fontainebleau, the son of the sculptor Jean II Gobert. Gobert entered the Royal Academy of Painting and Sculpture on 31 December 1701 as a portraitist. During the reign of Louis XIV he became the preferred painter of the great ladies of the court as evidenced by the large collection of portraits that he executed during that time. Gobert's style included incorporating the traits of mythology into his portraits.

List of works
 Portrait of Mademoiselle de Blois en Galatée triomphante See Here, (c.1692), Collection particulière
 Portrait of the duchesse du Maine,
 Portrait of Mademoiselle de Chartres (1690–98) See Here
 Portrait of Mademoiselle de la Mothe,
 Portrait of Marquise du Deffand,
 Portrait of the daughters of the prince de Condé (1689) See Here
 Portrait of Mademoiselle de Villefranche,
 Portrait of Mademoiselle de Maupin,
 Portrait of Mademoiselle de Chartres [niece of the above Mlle de Chartres] (c.1716) See Here
 Portrait of the Abesse de Chelles (1720) See Here
 Portrait of the princesse de Conti Portrait of the princesse de Condé (1713) See Here
 Portrait of the duchesse de Bourgogne, (1704) See Here
 Portrait of the duchesse de Chartres, (1700) See Here
 Portrait of the Hereditary Prince of Lorraine (1710) See Here
 Portrait of Mademoiselle de Valois, (1717) See Here
 Portrait of the Family of the Duke of ValentinoisPortrait of Mademoiselle de Chartres, See Here
 Portrait of Mademoiselle de Clermont, (1710–1720; held in the Royal Collection); See Here
 Portrait of the Anne de Baviére See Here
 Portrait of Louis XV of France (1716)
 Portrait of Yirmisekiz Mehmed Çelebi (1724); See here
 Portrait of Mademoiselle de La Roche sur Yon (?) See Here

Monsieur Gobert was also commissioned to do portraits of the Régent of France along with his second daughter Marie Louise Élisabeth d'Orléans (See here). Anne Louise Bénédicte de Bourbon was also a subject of his along with Louis XV. Louis XV's wife Marie Leszczyńska. Their eldest twin daughters, Princess Marie Louise Élisabeth and Princess Henriette Anne were also painted by Pierre in their infancy. Princess Marie Louise was also painted.  He died at Paris.

Bibliography
 Fernand Engerand, «Pierre Gobert, peintre de portrait''», in "L’Artiste", Mars 1897, pp. 161–175.

External links

1662 births
1744 deaths
People from Fontainebleau
17th-century French painters
18th-century French painters
Mythological painters
French portrait painters
French male painters
Court painters
18th-century French male artists